Ane Hansen may refer to:

 Ane Hansen (politician), Greenlandic politician
 Ane Håkansson Hansen (born 1975), Danish curler